Ciocci is an Italian surname. Notable people with the surname include:

Jacob Ciocci (born 1977), American artist, musician, and professor
Jessica Ciocci (born 1976), American artist
Massimo Ciocci (born 1968), Italian footballer and manager

Italian-language surnames